Bisera Vukotić (born 26 May 1944), known professionally as Olga Bisera, is a Yugoslav-born Italian film actress and producer.

She was born in Mostar, Bosnia and Herzegovina. She entered the Drama Arts Academy in Belgrade.

At 25 she made her film debut in Hollywood in Sidney Pollack's Castle Keep, and was put under contract by Columbia Pictures, moving to New York and attending the Lee Strasberg Theatre and Film Institute.

In the early 1970s Bisera moved to Italy, where she founded a production company, Cinemondial, and became a starlet of Italian genre cinema. She also appeared in The Spy Who Loved Me.

She retired in the early 1980s.

Partial filmography
Castle Keep (1969) – Baker's Wife
Super Fly T.N.T. (1973) – Lisa
Women in Cell Block 7 (1973) – Gerda
Amore libero - Free Love (1974) – Katia
Lunatics and Lovers (1976) – Ivana
The Virgo, the Taurus and the Capricorn (1977) – Enrica
The Spy Who Loved Me (1977) – Felicca
Safari Rally (1978) – Sandra Stark

References

External links
 

Living people
1944 births
Actors from Mostar
Italian film actresses
20th-century Italian actresses
Naturalised citizens of Italy
Yugoslav emigrants to Italy